The Brocas helm is a jousting helm on display at the Rotunda as part of the Tower of London armoury collection. It was commissioned by an English knight from an Italian armourer.

It is named after the Anglo-Norman Brocas family of Beaurepaire, Hampshire descending from the knight Sir Barnard Brocas (1330–1395). The collection of the family was auctioned after the death of a later Barnard Brocas, as the "Brocas Sale" in 1834.

References

1834 archaeological discoveries
Medieval helmets
Western plate armour
Individual helmets